İslahiye District Public Library, officially  İslahiye Sabiha-Aziz Bali District Public Library, is a public library located at İslahiye district of Gaziantep Province in southeastern Turkey. Opened in 2020, the library building was redeveloped from a 61-year old defunct prison.

History
İslahiye Prison was established on Santral St. 21 at Hacıali Öztürk neighborhood of İslahiye district in Gaziantep Province as a district penitentiary of type-A2 in 1958. Operated by the General Directorate for Penitentiary  and Detention Centers, part of the Ministry of Justice, the closed-category prison had four wards capable of 40 inmates.

By August 2019, the prison was closed down, and the 25 inmates were transferred to the type-L prison in Kilis. It was replaced with a new prison of type-T for 1,600 inmates, 600 detainees and 1,000 convicts, on the highway D.825 between Nurdağı and İslahiye to meet the needs of the region.

Redevelopment project
The prison building was converted into a library after restoration works financed by Adnan Bali, CEO of İşbank, one of the major commercial banks in Turkey. It was named "Sabiha-Aziz Bali District Public Library" (Sabiha-Aziz Bali İlçe Halk Kütüphanesi) in honor of Adnan Bali's parents "Sabiha-Aziz Bali Library". One year after the closing of the 61-year old prison, the library opened in a ceremony attended by local politicians on 21 August 2020.

Adnan Bali grew up in İslahiye, a small southern town. His father Aziz Bali, a local government official with limited income, built up a private home library to teache his children. His mother Sabiha Bali, who died in 2019, opened up the home library, which was the only library in the neighborhood, to all children in order to instill a love of reading.

There are reading rooms, meeting rooms and a computer room in the library. One of the wards is kept in order to preserve the memory of the building and carry it to the future.

It is one of the three public libraries in İslahiye district. The others are Altınüzüm Public Library and İslahiye Yeşilyurt Public Library.

In media 
The story of the redevelopment project featured in a documentary film directed by Vedat Atasoy.

References

Libraries in Turkey
Redevelopment projects in Turkey
2020 establishments in Turkey
Defunct prisons in Turkey
1958 establishments in Turkey
Buildings and structures in Gaziantep Province
Government buildings completed in 1958
İslahiye District